Joyce Gordon (March 25, 1929 – February 28, 2020) was an American actress.

Early life
Gordon was born on March 25, 1929, in Des Moines, Iowa, and grew up in Chicago. Her father was the founder of the National Barber and Beauty Manufacturers Association. She attended the University of Illinois and the University of Wisconsin. In her late teens, she left Chicago and went to New York to seek opportunities to appear on television programs.

Career

On television, Gordon appeared on The Ad-Libbers, Studio One and Robert Montgomery Presents. She also acted in commercials, at one point appearing daily on CBS as she promoted different products. She became the first woman president of Screen Actors Guild (SAG)'s New York branch in 1966. She was the first person to wear glasses on television and appear under her own name. She was also the voice of the recorded message callers hear when dialing an incorrect phone number.

Gordon provided English-language voices for actresses who spoke other languages. Over a two-year span, she dubbed 32 films that originally had dialog in other languages.

On radio, Gordon portrayed Cherry on Mark Trail and Barbara Miller on the comedy My Son Jeep.

Personal life and death
Gordon was married to actor Bernard Grant for more than 50 years, and they had two children, Mark and Melissa. She died on February 28, 2020, at age 90.

References

External links

1929 births
2020 deaths
Actresses from Chicago
Actresses from Des Moines, Iowa
Place of death missing
Actresses from New York City
Screen Actors Guild
University of Illinois alumni
University of Wisconsin–Madison alumni
20th-century American actresses
21st-century American actresses
American television actresses